Jack Davis may refer to:

Arts and entertainment
Jack Davis (actor) (1914–1992), American child actor
Jack Davis (playwright) (1917–2000), Australian playwright and poet
Jack Davis (cartoonist) (1924–2016), American cartoonist and illustrator

Business and industry
 Jack Davis, American engineer who worked on the ENIAC computer in the 1940s
Jack Davis (industrialist) (born 1933), American industrialist
Jack Davis, American businessman, co-founder of Novell

Sports
Jack Davis (English footballer) (1882–1963)
Jack Davis (Australian footballer) (1908–1991)
Jack Davis (hurdler) (1930–2012), American Olympic hurdler
Jack Davis (guard, born 1932) (1932–2013), American football player for the Boston Patriots
Jack Davis (guard, born 1933) (1933–2015), American football player for the Denver Broncos

Others
Mildirn, (a.k.a. Jack Davis, 1835–1914), Australian Aboriginal leader, translator and merchant
Jack Davis (prospector) (1879–1949), American prospector
Jack Davis (veteran) (1895–2003), British military veteran
Jack Davis (Canadian politician) (1916–1991)
Jack Davis (Illinois politician) (1935–2018)
Jack L. Davis (born 1950), American archaeologist
Jack E. Davis (fl. 2000s), American historian and Pulitzer Prize-winning author

See also
Jack Davies (disambiguation)
John Davies (disambiguation)
John Davis (disambiguation)